The Great Seal of the Commonwealth of Pennsylvania is the state seal for the Commonwealth of Pennsylvania. According to the state's website, the seal was authorized by the Pennsylvania General Assembly in 1791, and is "a symbol of authenticity which verifies that proclamations, commissions and other papers of state are legal and official."

Unlike most state seals, it has an obverse and a reverse. The Secretary of the Commonwealth is the keeper of the Great Seal, and has the duty of authenticating government documents, and proclaiming new law as enacted through its use.

Description
The obverse of the seal has a central image of a shield containing a ship under full sail, a plow, and three sheaves of wheat. These symbols represent the importance of commerce, labor, perseverance, and agriculture to the state's economy, as well as several of its geographic components (Philadelphia represented by the ship, for example). On either side of the shield are a stalk of Indian corn and an olive branch, representing the state's recognition of its past and hopes for the future. Atop the shield an eagle proudly symbolizes the state's sovereignty. The outer ring of the seal bears the words "Seal of the State of Pennsylvania," despite the state's official designation as the Commonwealth of Pennsylvania. The reverse side, or counterseal, pictures Lady Liberty dominating Tyranny in the form of a lion, along with the warning across the top, "Both Can't Survive."

Seals of the Government of Pennsylvania 
There are several seals of the Government of Pennsylvania, which use a variety of designs, including the Coat of Arms of Pennsylvania, the State Seal, and other distinct elements.

See also

Coat of arms of Pennsylvania
Flag of Pennsylvania

References

External links
History of the Seal of the State of Pennsylvania (Great Seal of the Commonwealth of Pennsylvania)

Symbols of Pennsylvania
Pennsylvania